Thailand's Royal Barge Procession (RTGS: krabuan phayuhayattra chonlamak) is a ceremony of both religious and royal significance which has taken place for nearly 700 years. The royal barges are a blend of craftsmanship and traditional Thai art. The Royal Barge Procession takes place rarely, marking only the most significant cultural and religious events. During the long reign of King Bhumibol Adulyadej, spanning over 70 years, the procession only occurred 16 times.

The Royal Barge Procession, in the present, consists of 52 barges: 51 historical barges, and the Royal Barge, the Narai Song Suban, which King Rama IX built in 1994. It is the only barge built during King Bhumibol's reign. These barges are manned by 2,082 oarsmen. The procession proceeds down the Chao Phraya River, from the Wasukri Royal Landing Place in Khet Dusit, Bangkok, passes the Temple of the Emerald Buddha, the Grand Palace, Wat Po, and finally arrives at Wat Arun ('Temple of the Dawn').

History

Thailand's Royal Barge Procession most likely began during the Ayutthaya period in the 14th century. Western visitors witnessed and wrote about an "immense procession with 200 boats" upon their arrival in Thailand in the 18th century. During the processions, the oarsmen were kept in rhythm by the beating of drums, with accompanying music. This traditional boat song was written by Prince Dhamma Dibes of the late-Ayutthaya period.

Most of the vessels in the procession doubled as warships, and when war erupted, the barges and boats were used as weapons.

In 1767, Burma invaded Thailand, and, for the second and last time, were able to capture the capital, Ayutthaya. The entire fleet was burned and destroyed after the Burmese found them at their hideaway. General Taksin rallied the Thais and established a new capital at Thonburi. During his short 15-year reign, Taksin ordered the reconstruction of the barge fleet, and used a fleet of 115 barges to carry a revered likeness of Buddha to his new capital.

Chao Phaya Chakri succeeded King Taksin and moved the capital to the east side of the river to what is now known as Bangkok. Chao Phaya Chakri, founder of the Chakri dynasty, ruled as King Buddha Yodfah (Rama I) and began the Royal Kathin Ceremony Procession. The Kathin Ceremony is a presentation of Kathin robes to monks and earns merit by honouring and supporting Buddhism.

Soon after his coronation in 1782, King Rama I ordered construction of the royal barge Si Suphannahong. The Si Suphannahong was the principal royal barge for more than a century. In 1911 King Rama VI launched its successor, also named Suphannahong.

The Prince of Nakhon Sawan, during the reign of Rama V, devised fleet formations, which became the standard "major" and "minor" formations used today.

Processions took place occasionally until the absolute monarchy ended in 1932. Most of royal barges were kept near Thonburi train station. It was bombed in WWII, destroying a large number of royal barges. They were not employed again until the celebration of the 25th century of the Buddhist Era in 1957. In 1959, Bhumibol Adulyadej revived the Royal Barge Procession as a means of presenting the Royal Kathin (robes for monks) in a royal ceremony.

Modern processions

Occurrences 
In the reign of King Rama IX, Bhumibol Adulyadej ( 1946–2016), 16 royal barge processions were conducted:

Major sailings

 The Buddhist Era 25th century celebrations - 14 May 1957
 Royal Barge Procession in the Bangkok Bicentenary Celebrations, 5 April 1982
 Royal Barge Procession for Royal Kathin Ceremony at Wat Arun, 20 October 1982
 Royal Barge Procession for Royal Kathin Ceremony at Wat Arun, 16 October 1987 (King's 60th Birthday)
 Royal Barge Procession for Royal Kathin Ceremony at Wat Arun, 7 November 1996 (King's 50th anniversary on the throne)
 Royal Barge Procession for Royal Kathin Ceremony at Wat Arun, 4 November 1999 (King's 6th cycle, 72 years old)
 Royal Barge Procession for APEC Meeting 20 October 2003  
 King's 60th – Diamond Jubilee of the king's accession to the throne. 12 June 2006 (52 barges) (video)
 Royal Barge Procession for Royal Kathin Ceremony at Wat Arun, 5 November 2007 (King's 80th Birthday) (video)
 Royal Barge Procession for Royal Kathin Ceremony at Wat Arun, scheduled for 22 October 2011 (King's 7th cycle, 84 years old), but postponed due to massive flooding and run on 9 November 2012. (video)
Royal Barge Procession for Thailand's new monarch, King Maha Vajiralongkorn 12 December 2019 (52 barges) (video)

Additional sailings (Royal Kathin)
 Royal Barge Procession for Royal Kathin Ceremony at Wat Arun 15 November 1959
 Royal Barge Procession for Royal Kathin Ceremony at Wat Arun, 2 November 1961
 Royal Barge Procession for Royal Kathin Ceremony at Wat Arun, 22 October 1962
 Royal Barge Procession for Royal Kathin Ceremony at Wat Arun, 15 November 1964
 Royal Barge Procession for Royal Kathin Ceremony at Wat Arun, 19 October 1965
 Royal Barge Procession for Royal Kathin Ceremony at Wat Arun, 27 October 1967
 Barge Procession to transport a Buddha Image, 12 April 1982

Fleet formations
The Royal Barge Procession is conducted in one of two formations, the major or the minor. The major formation, also known as the Major Battle Formation (Petch Phuang Major Battle Formation) dates from the time of King Narai. This formation is used for the more significant events, such as the Royal Kathin Ceremony, the movement of a sacred image of Buddha, or important occasions of state. The Petch Phuang Formation is arranged into five columns, with the royal barges in the center, and two rows of war barges on each side. In the minor formation, there are three columns, the royal barges in the middle, and a single row on each side.

Major barge procession formation
Arranged in five rows. 
 1 pair of lead barges which historically carried high-ranking officials with the position equivalent to today's ministry permanent secretary. 
 1 pair of ancient Thai battle boats with cannons at the bow. They historically carried military courtiers. 
 2 pairs of plain outer barges 
 4 pairs of inner barges with decorated mastheads in the shape of the garuda, monkeys, and ogres. 
 1 outer drum boat, 1 inner drum boat, with six musicians each playing the Pi and the klong khaek.
 1 inner, 1 outer boat for the Royal Police. 
 The Ekachai Barge with covered throne for monks' robes, the Buddha image or flower arrangements complete with regalia. 
 The Ekachai Hern Hao Barge and the Ekachai Lao Thong Barge, carrying musicians from the Prakhom band of the Bureau of the Royal Household and the military bands of the Royal Thai Army to lead the Royal Barge. 
 The Royal Barge with covered throne and regalia
 Pavilion Barge for the king's change of robes
 Second Royal barge
 1 pair of Police barges
 2 pairs of Army barges
 1 pair of plain rear barges

Minor barge procession formation
 1 pair lead barges
 1 pair attack barges
 7 pairs plain barges
 4 pairs animal masthead barges
 1 left drum boat, 1 right drum boat
 2 police boats—left and right
 The Ekachai Barge with a covered throne for the monks' robes, a Buddha figure or a flower arrangement complete with regalia 
 The Ekachai Hern Hao Barge with musicians and the Ekachai Lao Thong Barge
 The royal barge with appropriate regalia
 The second royal barge
 1 pair police barges

The barges

The royal barges

 The royal barge Suphannahong ('Golden Swan' or the 'Phoenix') was built in 1911 during the reign of Rama VI (King Vajiravudh) with a bow resembling a mythical swan, or hong, adorned with gold lacquer and glass jewels, with a crystalline ball and tassel dangling from her mouth. This 46-meter craft was carved from a single trunk of teakwood, and was launched 13 November 1911. There is a golden pavilion on board to house the king and his immediate royal family. Suphannahong is the regular royal barge, if a royal is travelling with the procession. Its hull is painted black.

The World Ship Trust, in 1992, named the royal barge Suphannahong a Maritime World Heritage.

 The royal barge Anantanakkharat (Ananta, 'king of serpents') was built during the reign of Rama III (King Nangklao). It was used as the primary royal barge of Rama IV (King Mongkut). The current Anantanakkharat was built during the reign of Rama VI (King Vajiravudh), and launched on 14 April 1914. The bow is carved into the seven-headed Nakkharat, the mystical snake-like creature, in gold lacquer and glass jewels. Anantanakkharat carries a smaller pagoda-like structure to carry holy objects, unlike the others royal barges, which are equipped with pavilions. Her hull is painted green.
 The royal barge Anekkachatphuchong ('variety of serpents') is the oldest of the four royal barges, built in the late-19th century during the reign of Rama V, (King Chulalongkorn). While no mythical figure is readily visible on the bow, numerous small ornamental Nāga figures are carved into the bow. The hull of Anekkachatphuchong is painted pink.
 The royal barge Narai Song Suban Ratchakan Thi Kao or the royal barge Narai Song Suban HM King Rama IX ("God Narayana on his carrier, Garuda") is the only barge built during the reign of Bhumibol Adulyadej, who laid the keel in 1994. It was built under commission by the Royal Thai Navy and the Thai Fine Arts Department and was launched 6 May 1996 to coincide with the celebration of the fiftieth anniversary of Bhumibol Adulyadej's accession to the throne. She temporarily took over the role of the main royal barge from Suphannahong for one occasion. She has a red hull. The original Narai Song Suban started life as Mongkol Suban, and had only the Garuda as a figurehead, before having a statue of Narayana retrofitted to her by King Mongkut and renamed Narai Song Suban.

The names of the four royal barges are composed in a consistent rhyme: "Suphannahong", "Narai Song Suban", "Anantanakkharat" and "Anekkachatphuchong". The royal barge's arrangement in the procession would have "Anantanakkharat" leading, with the "Suphannahong", "Narai Song Suban" and "Anekkachatphuchong" following respectively.

Other barges

Escort barges

Escort barges consist of different classes of barges. Most of their bows are decorated with either a painting or a figurehead of a mythical creature. Other types have less elaborate design. The barges with figureheads have rowers dressed in decorated purple uniforms with pink trousers and red ancient-style helmets with a tall crown and wide brim. The oarsmen on the Ekachai class are dressed in white uniforms with pink trousers and small red headgear with havelocks.

Ekachai-class barges are two barges with a gold painting of a horned creature that is half-nāga half-dragon, Ekachai Hern How and Ekachai Lao Thong. They might be used to tow Suphannahongse against a strong current or when the royal barge needs assistance.  Unlike other escort barges, Ekachai class barges are not equipped with cannon. The two barges can be distinguished by their slightly differing eyes. In the past, there have also been Ekachai-like royal barges, but none are in service today.
Krut-class barges are two barges with garuda figureheads with nagas caught on their wings and feet. The garuda on Krut Hern Het (Flying Garuda) is red while the one on Krut Tret Traichak ('Garuda travelling through the three worlds') is pink. 
Krabi-class barges consist of four barges with Vanara figureheads, Pali Rang Thawip (Vali rules the land), Sukrip Khrong Mueang (Sugriva rules the city), Krabi Ran Ron Rap, and Krabi Prap Mueang Man. The bow of Pali Rang Thawip depicts Vali, the elder brother of Sugriva on Sukrip Khrong Mueang, rulers of the Kishkindha Kingdom. Both have crowns on their heads with their body colors green and red respectively.  Krabi Ran Ron Rap and Krabi Prap Mueang Man ('Monkey defeats the city of evil') feature uncrowned warriors of Vanara Nilaphat (black body) and Hanuman (white body), respectively.
Asura-class barges are two barges with half-bird, half-ogre figureheads. The bow on Asura Vayuphak has an indigo body in a purple coat; Asura Paksi has a green body in a purple (front) and green (back) coat. 
Suea-class barges are barges with the painting of a tiger, Suea Thayan Chon and Suea Kamron Sin. The names of the barges are clearly written on the bow in red lettering. 
Thong barges are the twin barges that lead the procession. They are shaped much like a smaller, much less elaborate version of Anekkachatpuchong and are painted with their names in white on their bow freeboard area; the tips of their bow and stern are painted in gold. The men on these boats are dress like those on the royal barges, but not entirely alike.

Lesser escort barges
Most of the barges of the fleet are lesser escorts and attendants such as Ruea Dang, Ruea Saeng, police barges, and drum barges. They have no figurehead or cannon. They are painted mostly black, and their type, number, and name (if they have one) is painted on their bows in white. They can be differentiated as follows:
 Police barges have rowers dressed in black and have a relatively flat bow and stern, with the stern raised slightly higher than the bow.
 Saeng barges have a flat bow and stern, but rowers are dressed in white and black headgear; there are also slightly more rowers on these boats. The boats number from one to seven.
 Dang barges have a more pronounced bow and stern, with their shapes similar to those found on the Anekkachatpuchong and the Thong barges, but are smaller, painted black, and less elaborate. These boats number from 1 to 22. Their oarsmen are dressed in black uniforms similar to those of the rowers on royal barges, with red trim on their uniforms.
 The Tangmo ('watermelon') and the E. Leeung barges precede the royal barges. They are shaped like the Police and Saeng barges, but are smaller and sit lower in the water. The oarsmen dress like the rowers on the Saengs.

Preservation
The present fleet of barges was restored during the reign of King Bhumibol Adulyadej, as some had suffered damage in bombing raids on Bangkok during World War II. The dock that stored them, located in the Bangkok Noi District, became the National Museum of Royal Barges. Only eight important barges, including all four royal barges, are displayed in the museum due to limits of space. Displayed with the boats are a number of smaller historical artifacts related to the barge processions, such as old procession layout plans and some partial remains of the older decommissioned and/or damaged boats, including the bow and figurehead of the old Narai Song Suban. The remainder are kept at Wasukri Pier, next to the National Library of Thailand. All are stored out of the water to prevent deterioration. They return to the Chao Phraya River only for a Royal Barge Procession.

See also
Monarchy of Thailand
Coronation of the Thai monarch
60th Anniversary Celebrations of Bhumibol Adulyadej's Accession

References

Further reading
"Royal Barges" (Thai Language); Government Public Relations Department, Office of the Prime Minister; 
Technical Description of Royal Ceremonial Barges, Royal Thai Navy (accessed November 12, 2007).

External links

LINE-UP OF MAJOR ROYAL BARGE PROCESSION
 Royal Kathin Ceremony
 Royal Barge Procession Photos (Java-enhanced photos of the APEC 2003 Royal Barge Procession).
 Royal Barge Procession Video ( Dress rehearsal for the Royal Barge Procession on the JAO PHRAYA river, Bangkok, Thailand, 7 October 1999).

Thai monarchy
Thai culture
Royal barges of Thailand
Ceremonies in Thailand